Articles (arranged alphabetically) related to Armenia include:

#
1in.am ·
1268 Cilicia earthquake ·
1896 Ottoman Bank Takeover ·
1965 Yerevan demonstrations ·
1995 Armenian constitutional referendum ·
2005 Armenian constitutional referendum ·
1988 Armenian earthquake ·
1991 Armenian independence referendum ·
1992 in Armenian football ·
1993 in Armenian football ·
1993 Summer Offensives ·
1994 in Armenian football ·
1995 in Armenian football ·
1995-96 in Armenian football ·
1996-97 in Armenian football ·
1997 in Armenian football ·
1998 in Armenian football ·
1999 Armenian parliament shooting ·
1999 in Armenian football ·
2000 in Armenian football ·
2003 Armenian parliamentary election ·
2007 Armenian parliamentary election ·
2012 Armenian parliamentary election ·
2017 Armenian parliamentary election ·
2018 Armenian parliamentary election ·
2021 Armenian parliamentary election ·
2021 Armenian political crisis ·
1991 Armenian presidential election ·
1996 Armenian presidential election ·
1998 Armenian presidential election ·
2003 Armenian presidential election ·
2008 Armenian presidential election ·
2013 Armenian presidential election ·
2018 Armenian presidential election ·
2022 Armenian presidential election ·
2020–2021 Armenian protests ·
2021–2022 Armenia–Azerbaijan border crisis ·
2022 Armenian protests ·
2022 Yerevan explosion ·
32nd Chess Olympiad ·
5165 National Conservative Movement Party

A
A1plus ·
A21TV (Armenia) ·
.am ·
Aaron the Illustrious ·
Abas I of Armenia ·
Abovyan ·
Abraham of Armenia ·
Acacius of Sebaste ·
Acba Bank ·
Achin Nor-Achin ·
Achots ·
Adana massacre ·
Adequate Party ·
Adjika ·
Administration for Western Armenia ·
Administrative divisions of Armenia ·
AEGEE Yerevan ·
Agdam (rayon) ·
Aghdznik ·
Aghstev ·
Agriculture in Armenia ·
Air Armenia ·
Aircompany Armenia ·
Air Highnesses ·
Air-Van Airlines ·
Akdamar Island ·
Akhtala ·
Akhtamar Sevan ·
Akhurian River ·
Alashkert Martuni ·
Alaverdi ·
Alik ·
Aliovit ·
All Armenian Labour Party ·
All-Armenian National Statehood Party ·
Alliance of Ideological Liberals ·
Alliance Party (Armenia) ·
Alma Johansson ·
Almaz Yerevan ·
Alternative Party (Armenia) ·
Amaras Monastery ·
Amatuni ·
Amberd ·
Ameriabank ·
American Committee for Relief in the Near East ·
American University of Armenia ·
Anahit ·
Angl ·
Ani ·
Anthem of the Armenian SSR ·
Anti-Armenianism ·
Antzevasiq ·
Antzitene ·
Aparan ·
The Apex Theory ·
Apostolic Nunciature to Armenia ·
Apricot ·
Apricot Country Party ·
Ara the Beautiful ·
Arab conquest of Armenia ·
Arabkir District ·
Arabkir Yerevan ·
Aragats Gyumri ·
Aragatsotn ·
FC Armavir ·
Aramu ·
Aranean ·
Ararat (brandy) ·
Ararat (film) ·
Ararat (province) ·
Ararat plain ·
Aras River ·
Aravan ·
Aravelian ·
Arba Lijoch ·
Archaruni ·
Archaruniq ·
Architecture of Armenia ·
Ardshinbank ·
Argentina–Armenia relations ·
Argishti II of Urartu ·
Argishtis I of Urartu ·
Ark Airways ·
Arkhalig ·
Armavia ·
Armavir (province) ·
Armavir, Armenia ·
ArmCosmos ·
Armed Forces of Armenia ·
Armenia ·
Armenia (name) ·
Armenia Airways ·
Armenia Alliance ·
Armenia and the European Union ·
Armenia and the United Nations ·
Armenia at the 1994 Winter Olympics ·
Armenia at the 1996 Summer Olympics ·
Armenia at the 1998 Winter Olympics ·
Armenia at the 2000 Summer Olympics ·
Armenia at the 2002 Winter Olympics ·
Armenia at the 2004 Summer Olympics ·
Armenia at the 2006 Winter Olympics ·
Armenia at the 2006 Winter Paralympics ·
Armenia–Australia relations ·
Armenia-Azerbaijan relations ·
Armenia–Brazil relations ·
Armenia–BSEC relations ·
Armenia–Bulgaria relations ·
Armenia–Canada relations ·
Armenia–Chile relations ·
Armenia–China relations ·
Armenia–Croatia relations ·
Armenia–Cyprus relations ·
Armenia Davis Cup team ·
Armenia–Denmark relations ·
Armenia–Egypt relations ·
Armenia-EU Comprehensive and Enhanced Partnership Agreement ·
Armenia-EU Partnership and Cooperation Agreement ·
Armenia Fed Cup team ·
Armenia–France relations ·
Armenia–Georgia relations ·
Armenia–Germany relations ·
Armenia–Greece relations ·
Armenia–Hungary relations ·
Armenia–India relations ·
Armenia in the Council of Europe ·
Armenia in the Eurovision Song Contest ·
Armenia in the Eurovision Song Contest 2006 ·
Armenia in the Eurovision Song Contest 2007 ·
Armenia in the Eurovision Song Contest 2008 ·
Armenia in the Eurovision Song Contest 2009 ·
Armenia in the Eurovision Song Contest 2010 ·
Armenia in the Eurovision Song Contest 2012 ·
Armenia in the Eurovision Song Contest 2013 ·
Armenia in the Eurovision Song Contest 2014 ·
Armenia in the Eurovision Song Contest 2015 ·
Armenia in the Eurovision Song Contest 2016 ·
Armenia in the Eurovision Song Contest 2017 ·
Armenia in the Eurovision Song Contest 2018 ·
Armenia in the Eurovision Song Contest 2019 ·
Armenia in the Eurovision Song Contest 2020 ·
Armenia in the Eurovision Song Contest 2022 ·
Armenia–Iran relations ·
Armenia–Iraq relations ·
Armenia is Our Home ·
Armenia–Israel relations ·
Armenia–Italy relations ·
Armenia–Japan relations ·
Armenia–Kazakhstan relations ·
Armenia–Lebanon relations ·
Armenia–Mexico relations ·
Armenia national baseball team ·
Armenia national football team ·
Armenia national rugby union team ·
Armenia–NATO relations ·
Armenia–OSCE relations ·
Armenia–Pakistan relations ·
Armenia–Palestine relations ·
Armenia–Philippines relations ·
Armenia–Poland relations ·
Armenia–Portugal relations ·
Armenia–Romania relations ·
Armenia–Russia relations ·
Armenia–Saudi Arabia relations ·
Armenia–Serbia relations ·
Armenia–Singapore relations ·
Armenia–Spain relations ·
Armenia, Subartu And Sumer ·
Armenia–Switzerland relations ·
Armenia–Syria relations ·
Armenia–Tajikistan relations ·
Armenia–Turkey relations ·
Armenia–Turkmenistan relations ·
Armenia Tree Project ·
Armenia–Ukraine relations ·
Armenia–United Arab Emirates relations ·
Armenia–United Kingdom relations ·
Armenia–United States relations ·
Armenia–Uruguay relations ·
Armenia–Uzbekistan relations ·
Armenian Academy of Sciences ·
Armenian Air Defense ·
Armenian Air Force ·
Armenian Airlines ·
Armenian alphabet ·
Armenian American Political Action Committee ·
Armenian American Wellness Center ·
Armenian Apostolic Church ·
Armenian Army ·
Armenian Assembly of America ·
Armenian Atlantic Association ·
Armenian Automobile Federation ·
Armenian Baseball Federation ·
Armenian Basketball Federation ·
Armenian battalions ·
Armenian Biathlon Federation ·
Armenian Border Guard ·
Armenian Boxing Federation ·
Armenian Brotherhood Church ·
Armenian calendar ·
Armenian casualties during World War I ·
Armenian casualties of deportations ·
Armenian Catholic Church ·
Armenian chant ·
Armenian Chess Championship ·
Armenian College (Kolkata) ·
Armenian Communist Party ·
Armenian community of Dhaka ·
Armenian Congress of Eastern Armenians ·
Armenian Constructive Party ·
Armenian cucumber ·
Armenian Cup ·
Armenian Customs Service ·
Armenian dance ·
Armenian Dances ·
Armenian Darts Federation ·
Armenian Democratic Liberal Party .
Armenian diaspora ·
Armenian diaspora in Europe ·
Armenian diaspora in the Middle East ·
Armenian diplomatic missions ·
Armenian Distance Learning Network ·
Armenian Diving Federation ·
Armenian dram ·
Armenian dram sign ·
Armenian Dream ·
Armenian dress ·
Armenian Eagles Unified Armenia Party ·
Armenian Economic Association ·
Armenian Environmental Network ·
Armenian Esports Federation ·
Armenian Evangelical Church ·
Armenian fedayi ·
Armenian Fencing Federation ·
Armenian First League ·
Armenian First League 2006 ·
Armenian First League 2007 ·
Armenian Floorball Federation ·
Armenian General Benevolent Union ·
Armenian genocide ·
The Armenian Genocide (documentary) ·
Armenian Genocide Remembrance Day ·
Armenian gull ·
Armenian Gymnastics Federation ·
Armenian Handball Federation ·
Armenian Highland ·
Armenian Hockey League ·
Armenian hypothesis ·
Armenian illuminated manuscript ·
Armenian Institute of International and Security Affairs ·
Armenian International Airways ·
Armenian irregular units ·
Armenian Kingdom of Cilicia ·
Armenian Kyokushin Karate Federation ·
Armenian language ·
Armenian Legion ·
Armenian literature ·
Armenian Mesopotamia ·
Armenian mythology ·
Armenian National Academy of Sciences ·
Armenian National Assembly (Ottoman Empire) ·
Armenian national awakening in the Ottoman Empire ·
Armenian National Cinematheque ·
Armenian National Committee of America ·
Armenian National Constitution ·
Armenian National Council of Karabagh ·
Armenian National Disabled Sports Federation ·
Armenian National Federation of Bodybuilding ·
Armenian national ice hockey team ·
Armenian national movement ·
Armenian National Movement Party ·
Armenian National Rowing and Canoe Federation ·
Armenian National Squash Federation ·
Armenian National Students Association ·
Armenian needlelace ·
Armenian newspapers ·
Armenian nobility ·
Armenian notables deported from the Ottoman capital in 1915 ·
Armenian Numismatic Society ·
Armenian oak ·
Armenian Oblast ·
Armenian Paralympic Committee ·
Armenian parliamentary election, 2003 ·
Armenian parliamentary election, 2007 ·
Armenian presidential election, 2008 ·
Armenian passport ·
Armenian Patriotic Society of Europe ·
Armenian Philharmonic Orchestra ·
Armenian population by country ·
Armenian population by urban area ·
Armenian postal codes ·
Armenian Powerlifting Federation ·
Armenian Premier League ·
Armenian Premier League 2005 ·
Armenian Premier League 2006 ·
Armenian Premier League 2007 ·
Armenian Professional Society ·
Armenian Public Television ·
Armenian Quarter ·
Armenian Question ·
Armenian quote ·
Armenian Relief Society ·
Armenian Research Center ·
Armenian resistance (1914-1918) ·
Armenian Revolutionary Federation ·
Armenian Revolutionary Songs ·
Armenian rock ·
Armenian rock lizard ·
Armenian rouble ·
Armenian School (Madras) ·
Armenian Secret Army for the Liberation of Armenia ·
Armenian Shooting Federation ·
Armenian Shotokan Karate Federation ·
Armenian Ski Federation ·
Armenian Snooker And Pocket Billiards Federation ·
Armenian Social-Democratic Labour Organization ·
Armenian SSR ·
Armenian State Institute of Physical Culture ·
Armenian Stock Exchange ·
Armenian Street, Chennai ·
Armenian Student Sports Federation ·
Armenian Supercup ·
Armenian surnames ·
Armenian Swimming Federation ·
Armenian Synchronized Swimming Federation ·
Armenian Table Soccer Federation ·
Armenian Table Tennis Federation ·
Armenian Taekwondo Federation ·
Armenian Triathlon Federation ·
Armenian Tax Service ·
Armenian verbs ·
Armenian volunteer units ·
Armenian Weekly ·
Armenian Weightlifting Federation ·
Armenian Workers Communist Party ·
Armenian Workers Union ·
Armenian-American ·
Armenian-Assyrian relations ·
Armenian-Azerbaijani War ·
Armenian-Byzantine Battle ·
Armenian-Greek relations ·
Armenian-Parthian War ·
Armenians ·
Armenians in Australia .
Armenians in Bulgaria ·
Armenians in Burma ·
Armenians in Cyprus ·
Armenians in Egypt ·
Armenians in Georgia ·
Armenians in Germany ·
Armenians in Greece ·
Armenians in Hungary ·
Armenians in India ·
Armenians in Indonesia ·
Armenians in Iraq ·
Armenians in Kuwait ·
Armenians in Lebanon ·
Armenians in Poland ·
Armenians in Romania ·
Armenians in Russia ·
Armenians in Samtskhe–Javakheti ·
Armenians in Singapore ·
Armenians in Syria ·
Armenians in the Czech Republic ·
Armenians in the Netherlands ·
Armenians in the Ottoman Empire ·
Armenians in the San Francisco Bay Area .
Armenians in Turkey ·
Armenians in Turkmenistan ·
Armenians in Ukraine ·
Armenian-Tatar massacres ·
Armenian-Turkish relations ·
Armeno-Kipchak ·
Armenpress .
Arme-Shupria people ·
Arminco .
Armrosgazprom ·
ArmSwissBank ·
Armwrestling Federation of Armenia ·
Arpa River ·
Arpa Yeghegnadzor ·
Arsacid Dynasty of Armenia ·
Arsames I ·
Arsames II ·
Arsamosata ·
Artashat (ancient city) ·
Artashat, Armenia ·
Artavasdes I of Armenia ·
Artavasdes II of Armenia ·
Artavasdes III of Armenia ·
Artaxiad Dynasty ·
Artaxias I ·
Artaxias II ·
Artaxias III ·
Artik ·
Artinis ·
Artokh ·
Artsakh ·
Artsakhbank ·
Artsakh Freedom Party ·
Artsakh State Museum ·
Artsruni ·
Artsvashen ·
Aruchavank church ·
Arzashkun ·
Ashot I ·
Ashot II ·
Ashot III ·
Ashtarak ·
Askeran ·
Askeran clash ·
Assembly of Armenians of Europe ·
Assyrians in Armenia ·
Atlantis European Airways ·
Austrian Armenian Cultural Society ·
Ayas (city) ·
Ayran ·
Ayrarat ·
Azat River ·
Azgayin Zhoghov ·
Aznavour Noyemberyan

B
Badminton Federation of Armenia ·
Bagaran ·
Bagmasti ·
Bagras ·
Bagratuni Dynasty ·
Bagrevand ·
Bagvarti ·
Baklava ·
Balasanyan Alliance Social Party ·
Baluni ·
Bambir ·
Banants Stadium ·
Basean ·
The Battle of 40 ·
Battle of Alexandropol ·
Battle of Arara ·
Battle of Artaxata ·
Battle of Avarayr ·
Battle of Bagrevand ·
Battle of Bash Abaran ·
Battle of Dilman ·
Battle of Kara Killisse (1918) ·
Battle of Kars (1920) ·
Battle of Kelbajar ·
Battle of Khasdour ·
Battle of Nairi ·
Battle of Oltu ·
Battle of Rhandeia ·
Battle of Sardarapat ·
Battle of Sarıkamış (1920) ·
Battle of Tigranocerta ·
Battle of Varnakert ·
Battle of Wadi al-Khazandar ·
Belahuit ·
Bgheno-Noravank ·
Birds of Armenia ·
Birthright Armenia ·
Bjni ·
BKMA Yerevan ·
Blue Mosque, Yerevan ·
Blue Sky Airlines ·
Borscht ·
Bright Alliance ·
Bright Armenia ·
Burek ·
Buzlukh ·
Byurakan Observatory ·
Byureghavan ·
Byzantine Armenia ·
Byzantine-Sassanid Wars ·
Bznuni ·
Bznuniq

C
Calendar of Saints (Armenian Apostolic Church) ·
Canadians of Armenian descent ·
Cannabis in Armenia ·
Capital punishment in Armenia ·
Capture of Shusha ·
Cataphract ·
Cathedral of Ani ·
Armenian Cathedral of the Holy Cross ·
Cathedral of the Holy Martyrs, Gyumri ·
Catholic Church in Armenia ·
Caucasian Albania ·
Caucasus Campaign ·
Censuses of Armenia ·
Central Bank of Armenia ·
Central Bank Visitor Centre (Armenia) .
Central Depository of Armenia .
Central Electoral Commission of Armenia ·
Chambarak ·
Chamchwilde ·
Charentsavan ·
Charlotte of Cyprus ·
Chazinzarians ·
Checkers Federation of Armenia ·
Cheoreg ·
Chess Federation of Armenia ·
Children of Armenia Fund ·
Chorpan Tarkhan ·
Christian-Democratic Rebirth Party ·
Christian Democratic Union of Armenia ·
Christianity in Armenia ·
Church of St. John, Mastara ·
Church of St. Nerses the Great ·
Cilicia ·
Cinema of Armenia ·
Citizen's Decision ·
Civil Aviation Committee (Armenia) ·
Civil Contract (Armenia) ·
Civilitas Foundation ·
Classical Armenian ·
Coat of arms of Armenia ·
Coat of arms of Nagorno-Karabakh ·
Coat of arms of the Armenian SSR ·
Communications in Armenia ·
Confederation of Trade Unions of Armenia ·
Congressional Armenian Caucus ·
Conservative Party (Armenia) ·
Constantine I, Prince of Armenia ·
Constantine I, King of Armenia ·
Constantine I of Cilicia ·
Constantine II, Prince of Armenia ·
Constantine II, King of Armenia ·
Constantine II the Woolmaker ·
Constantine III of Armenia ·
Constantine IV of Armenia ·
Constantine V of Armenia ·
Constantine VI of Armenia ·
Constitution of Armenia ·
Constitutional Court of Armenia ·
Constitutional Rights Union ·
Corduene ·
Corruption in Armenia ·
Council of Europe Office (Armenia) ·
Country of Living ·
COVID-19 pandemic in Armenia ·
Creative Europe–Armenia ·
Crime in Armenia ·
CSKA Yerevan ·
Cuisine of Armenia ·
Culture of Armenia ·
Cyrion and Candidus

D
Dadi Vank ·
Dar-Alages ·
Daranali ·
Dariunq ·
Dastakert ·
David I Anhoghin ·
David II of Lori ·
David of Sasun ·
David Bek ·
Debed ·
Debed Alaverdi ·
Declaration of Independence of Armenia (1918) ·
Declaration of State Sovereignty of Armenia ·
Deep and Comprehensive Free Trade Area ·
Defence Minister of Armenia ·
Defense of Van ·
Degiq ·
Delegation of the European Union to Armenia ·
Democratic Alternative Party ·
Democratic Homeland Party ·
Democratic Liberal Party (Armenia) ·
Democratic Liberal Party of Armenia ·
Democratic Party of Armenia ·
Democratic Republic of Armenia ·
Democratic Way Party ·
Demographics of Armenia ·
Denial of the Armenian Genocide ·
Dhol ·
Dignified Future Party ·
Dignified Way Party ·
Dignity, Democracy, Motherland ·
Dilijan ·
Dimaksean ·
Diplomatic missions in Armenia ·
Diplomatic missions of Armenia ·
Djahan ·
Djidjrakatsi ·
Dolma ·
Doogh ·
Duduk ·
Dvin ·
Dvin Artashat ·
Dzayrakuyn Vartabed ·
Dzophq ·
Dzoraget (river) ·
Dzorapor

E
Eastern Armenia ·
Eastern Armenian language ·
Eastern Armenian verb table ·
Eastern Christian Monasticism ·
Eastern Partnership ·
Echmiadzin ·
Echmiadzin Gospels ·
Economy of Armenia ·
Education in Armenia ·
Eetch ·
Ekeleatzi ·
Elections in Armenia ·
Elisabethpol Governorate ·
Elishe ·
Embassy of Armenia, Cairo ·
Embassy of Armenia in Ottawa ·
Embassy of Armenia in Washington ·
Embassy of Armenia, London ·
Energy in Armenia ·
Equestrian Federation of Armenia ·
Erato of Armenia ·
ErAZ ·
Erebuni Airport ·
Erebuni Fortress ·
Erebuni Yerevan ·
Erivan Governorate ·
Erivan khanate ·
Eruandhuni ·
Erukhan ·
Ethnic minorities in Armenia ·
EUNIC Armenia ·
Eurasia International University ·
Eurasian Union ·
Euronest Parliamentary Assembly ·
European Armenian Federation for Justice and Democracy ·
European Business Association (Armenia) ·
European Friends of Armenia ·
European Integration NGO ·
European Neighbourhood Policy ·
European Party of Armenia ·
European Union Mission in Armenia ·
European Union Monitoring Capacity to Armenia ·
European University of Armenia ·
European Youth Parliament – Armenia ·
EU Planning Assistance Team in Armenia ·
EU Strategy for the South Caucasus ·
Evocabank ·
Expeditus ·
Extreme points of Armenia

F
Fair Armenia Party ·
Fauna of Armenia ·
FC Araks Ararat ·
FC Ararat Yerevan ·
FC Artashat ·
FC Banants ·
FC Bentonit Ijevan ·
FC Dinamo Yerevan ·
FC Gandzasar Kapan ·
FC Kilikia Yerevan ·
FC Kotayk Abovian ·
FC Masis ·
FC MIKA ·
FC Pyunik ·
FC Shirak ·
FC Vanadzor ·
FC Yeghvard ·
FC Yerevan ·
FC Zvartnots ·
Fedayeen ·
Federation of Euro-Asian Stock Exchanges ·
Fereydan ·
Figure Skating Federation of Armenia ·
First Council of Constantinople ·
First Nagorno-Karabakh War ·
FK Gyumri ·
FK Karabakh ·
Flag of Armenia ·
Flag of Nagorno-Karabakh ·
Flag of the Armenian SSR ·
FlyArna ·
FlyOne Armenia ·
Fondation Université Française en Arménie ·
Football Federation of Armenia ·
Football in Armenia ·
Foreign relations of Armenia ·
Foreign relations of Nagorno-Karabakh ·
For The Republic Party·
The Forty Days of Musa Dagh ·
Forty Martyrs of Sebaste ·
For Social Justice (Armenia) ·
Franco-Armenian relations ·
Free Democrats (Armenia) ·
Free Homeland Alliance ·
Freedom Party (Armenia) ·
French Armenian Legion ·
Fund for Armenian Relief ·
Fuzuli (city)

G
Gabelian ·
Gagik I of Armenia ·
Gagik II ·
GALAS LGBTQ+ Armenian Society ·
Gandzasar monastery ·
Gardman ·
Garegin Khachatryan ·
Garithaianik ·
Garni ·
Garni Gorge ·
Gata ·
Gavar ·
Geghama mountains ·
Geghard ·
Gegharkunik ·
Generation of Independence Party (Armenia) ·
Gentuni ·
Geography of Armenia ·
Geographical Issues in Armenia ·
Geology of Armenia ·
Georgian-Armenian War 1918 ·
Getashen ·
Ghapama ·
Ghazanchetsots Cathedral ·
The Golden-Headed Fish ·
Golf Federation of Armenia ·
Goltn ·
Goranboy ·
Goris ·
Goshavank ·
Government House, Yerevan ·
Grand Lodge of Armenia ·
Grappling Federation of Armenia ·
Greater Armenia (political concept) ·
Greeks in Armenia ·
Green Party of Armenia ·
Gregory of Narek ·
Gregory the Illuminator ·
G'Tichavank ·
Gugark ·
Calouste Gulbenkian ·
Gyumri ·
Gyumri City Stadium

H
Hachdeanq ·
Hadrut ·
Haghartsin Monastery ·
Haghpat ·
Haghpat Monastery ·
Haigazian Armenological Review ·
Halay ·
Halva ·
Hamazkayin ·
Hamidian massacres ·
Hamshenis ·
Hanrapetutyun Party ·
Hanrapetakan Stadium ·
Hanzith ·
Harissa (dish) ·
Haritchavank Monastery ·
Hayasa-Azzi ·
Hayastani Azgayin Scautakan Sharjum Kazmakerputiun ·
Hayazn ·
Haybusak University of Yerevan ·
Hayhurum ·
Hayk ·
Hayk Party ·
HayPost ·
Hello Yerevan ·
Heritage (political party) ·
Hethum I of Armenia ·
Hethum II of Armenia ·
Hethumids ·
Hetq .
Hidden Armenians ·
HIMA Youth Initiative ·
Hinduism in Armenia ·
Historical Armenian population ·
History of Armenia ·
History of Armenia (Moses of Chorene) ·
History of Nagorno-Karabakh ·
History of Nagorno-Karabakh (1918-1923) ·
History of the Jews in Armenia ·
Hittite-Hayasa War ·
Holy See of Cilicia ·
Homeland Salvation Movement ·
Homshetsi ·
Honored Artist of Armenia ·
Horizon Weekly ·
Horom Citadel ·
House of Hasan-Jalalyan ·
Hrazdan ·
Hrazdan River ·
Hrazdan Stadium ·
Human Rights Defender of Armenia ·
Human rights in Armenia ·
Hummus

I
Ice Hockey Federation of Armenia ·
Ice hockey in Armenia ·
Identity and Unity Party ·
I Have Honor Alliance ·
Ijevan ·
Impeachment Union ·
Impuls Dilijan ·
InecoBank ·
Information Centre on NATO in Armenia ·
INOGATE ·
Institute of Liberal Politics ·
Institute of Mathematics of National Academy of Sciences of Armenia ·
Intellectual Armenia Party ·
Intellectual Property Agency of Armenia ·
International Center for Human Development ·
Interparliamentary Assembly on Orthodoxy ·
Iran–Armenia relations ·
Isaac of Armenia ·
Ishpuinis of Urartu ·
Islam in Armenia

J
Jabrayil ·
James I of Cyprus ·
Janus of Cyprus ·
Jermuk ·
Jermuk (drink) ·
Jews in Armenia ·
John II of Cyprus ·
John Mamikonean ·
Judaism in Armenia ·
Judiciary of Armenia ·
Judo Federation of Armenia ·
Jupiter-Avia ·
Justice (Armenia) ·
Justice Commandos Against Armenian Genocide

K
Kajaran ·
Kalbajar ·
Kamancha ·
Kamsarakan ·
Kanach Zham ·
Kanaz Yerevan ·
Kanun (instrument) ·
Kapan ·
Karabakh ·
Karabakh carpet ·
Karabakh horse ·
Karabakh khanate ·
Karate Federation of Armenia ·
Karbelian ·
Karin ·
Karin Yerevan ·
Karqayin ·
Kars ·
Kars Oblast ·
Kasagh River ·
Kasakh Ashtarak ·
Kashkak ·
Kavare Mer ·
Kaymaklı Monastery ·
Kazak Stadium ·
Kebab ·
Kecharis Monastery ·
Kelashin ·
Kenuni ·
Khachkar ·
Khachkar destruction in Nakhchivan ·
Khaz (notation) ·
Khaldi (god) ·
Khanates of the Caucasus ·
Khanasor Expedition ·
Khash (dish) ·
Khojali ·
Khojavend ·
Khor Virap ·
Khorenatsi medal ·
Khorkhoruni ·
Khosrov III the Small ·
Kibbeh ·
Kingdom of Armenia (antiquity) ·
Kingdom of Armenia (Middle Ages) ·
Kingdom of Lori ·
Kingdom of Vaspurakan ·
Kirovabad pogrom ·
Kiurike I ·
Kiurike II ·
Kofta ·
Korduq ·
Korfball Federation of Armenia ·
Koryun ·
Kotayk ·
Kotayk Brewery ·
Kotayk Stadium ·
Kozan, Adana ·
Kumairi Gyumri ·
Kura-Araxes culture ·
Kurdish-Armenian relations ·
Kurdistan Uyezd

L
Lachin ·
Lachin (rayon) ·
Lachin corridor ·
Lahmacun ·
Lake Akna ·
Lake Arpi ·
Lake Kari ·
Lake Lessing ·
Lake Sevan ·
Lake Urmia ·
Lake Van ·
Landmine situation in Nagorno Karabakh ·
Languages of Armenia ·
Lavash ·
Law and Unity ·
Law enforcement in Armenia ·
Law enforcement in Nagorno-Karabakh ·
Law of Armenia ·
Lazarev Institute of Oriental Languages ·
Lazarus Saturday ·
League for the Liberation of the Peoples of the USSR ·
League of Armenian Social Democrats ·
Leo I, Prince of Armenia ·
Leo I, King of Armenia ·
Leo II, Prince of Armenia ·
Leo II, King of Armenia ·
Leo III of Armenia ·
Leo IV of Armenia ·
Leo V of Armenia ·
Leo VI of Armenia ·
Leontine martyrs ·
Lernagorts Stadium ·
Lernamerdz ·
Lernayin Artsakh ·
Lesser Armenia ·
LGBT rights in Armenia (Gay rights)·
Liberal Democratic Union of Armenia ·
Liberalism in Armenia ·
List of airports in Armenia ·
List of ambassadors of Armenia to the United States ·
List of ambassadors of the United States to Armenia ·
List of Armenian ethnic enclaves ·
List of Armenian flags ·
List of Armenian kings ·
List of Armenian Patriarchs of Jerusalem ·
List of castles in Armenia ·
List of cities in Armenia ·
List of diplomatic missions in Armenia ·
List of equipment of the Armenian Armed Forces ·
List of football clubs in Armenia ·
List of kings of Ani ·
List of kings of Urartu ·
List of lakes of Armenia ·
List of members of the eighth National Assembly of Armenia ·
List of members of the seventh National Assembly of Armenia ·
List of monarchs of the Armenian Kingdom of Cilicia ·
List of museums in Yerevan .
List of newspapers in Armenia ·
List of parks in Yerevan .
List of people on coins of Armenia ·
List of political parties in Armenia ·
List of renamed cities in Armenia ·
List of rivers of Armenia ·
List of sports venues in Yerevan ·
List of squares in Yerevan ·
List of the busiest airports in Armenia ·
List of universities in Armenia ·
List of universities in Yerevan ·
List of volcanoes in Armenia ·
Little Ararat ·
Lori Province ·
Lori Vanadzor ·
Luis Ararat ·
Lutipri

M
Madrid Principles ·
Makaravank Monastery ·
Malatia Yerevan ·
Malkaz ·
Mammals of Armenia ·
Mamikonian ·
Manavazian ·
Mandakuni ·
Manic Depressive Psychosis (band) ·
Mantı ·
Maraghar Massacre ·
Maralik ·
Mardakert ·
Mardakert and Martuni Offensives ·
Marie of Armenia ·
Martuni, Armenia ·
Marwanid ·
Marxist Party of Armenia ·
Marzpanate Period ·
Marzpetuni ·
Masis (city) ·
Mass media in Armenia ·
Mas-Wrestling Federation of Armenia ·
Matagh ·
Matenadaran ·
Matnakash ·
Media freedom in Armenia ·
Media in Armenia ·
Mediamax news agency .
Medieval Armenia ·
Meghri ·
Meletius of Antioch ·
Melik ·
Menuas of Urartu ·
Mer Hayrenik ·
Metsamor Nuclear Power Plant ·
Metsamor site ·
Meze ·
Middle Armenian ·
Mighty Fatherland ·
Mika Stadium ·
Mikael Ter-Mikaelian Institute for Physical Research ·
Military history of Armenia ·
Military history of Nagorno-Karabakh ·
Military ranks of Armenia ·
Mining in Armenia ·
Ministry of Defence of Armenia ·
Ministry of Diaspora ·
Ministry of Economy (Armenia) ·
Ministry of Education and Science (Armenia) ·
Ministry of Emergency Situations (Armenia) ·
Ministry of Energy Infrastructures and Natural Resources (Armenia) ·
Ministry of Environment (Armenia) ·
Ministry of Finance (Armenia) ·
Ministry of Foreign Affairs (Armenia) ·
Ministry of Health (Armenia) ·
Ministry of High-Tech Industry (Armenia) ·
Ministry of Justice (Armenia) ·
Ministry of Labor and Social Affairs (Armenia) ·
Ministry of Territorial Administration and Infrastructure ·
Ministry of Transport and Communication (Armenia) ·
Mission of Armenia to the European Union ·
Mission Party ·
Mitanni ·
Mithridates of Armenia ·
Mjej Gnuni ·
Mleh of Armenia ·
Monastery of Yedi Kilisa ·
Mongol invasions of Georgia and Armenia ·
Moses of Chorene ·
Mother Armenia ·
Mount Aragats ·
Mount Ararat ·
Moxoene ·
Mugni Gospels ·
Municipalities of Armenia ·
Musa Dagh ·
Musasir ·
Musasir temple ·
Mush Charentsavan ·
Mushki ·
Music of Armenia ·
My Brother's Road ·
My Step Alliance

N
Nagorno-Karabakh ·
Nagorno-Karabakh Autonomous Oblast ·
Nagorno-Karabakh constitutional referendum, 2006 ·
Nagorno-Karabakh Defense Army ·
Nagorno-Karabakh presidential election, 2007 ·
Nairi (people) ·
Nairi Stadium ·
Nairit Yerevan ·
Nakharar ·
Nakhchivan Autonomous Republic ·
Nakhchivan khanate ·
Name of Armenia ·
Namrun Kalesi ·
National Academy of Sciences of Western Armenia ·
National Agenda Party ·
National Archery Federation of Armenia ·
National Assembly of Armenia ·
National Assembly of Nagorno Karabakh ·
National Association of Girl Guides and Girl Scouts of Armenia ·
National anthem of Armenia ·
National Christian Party (Armenia) ·
National Competitiveness Report of Armenia ·
National Democratic Pole ·
National Democratic Union of Armenia ·
National Democrats Union ·
National Federation of Modern Pentathlon of Armenia ·
National Foundation of Science and Advanced Technologies ·
National Hero of Armenia ·
National Kendo Federation of Armenia ·
National Polytechnic University of Armenia ·
National Progress Party of Armenia ·
National Security Party ·
National Security Service (Armenia) ·
National Unity (Armenia) ·
National University of Architecture and Construction of Armenia ·
Neopaganism in Armenia ·
Nerkin · 
Nerk'in Getashen ·
Nerses IV ·
New Country (Armenia) ·
New Political Culture Party ·
New Times (political party) ·
Night Ark ·
Niphates ·
Nor Hachn ·
Noravank ·
Norshirakan ·
Northern Avenue, Yerevan ·
Nourie Hadig ·
Novair (Armenia) ·
Noyemberyan ·
Nvarsak Treaty

O
Oaksenham ·
Octoechos (liturgy) ·
Odzun ·
Old Armenian ·
Olnut ·
One Armenia Party ·
Oodians ·
Open Society Foundations–Armenia ·
Operation Nemesis ·
Operation Ring ·
Ordinariate for Catholics of Armenian Rite in Eastern Europe ·
Orduniq ·
Organization for Security and Cooperation in Europe ·
Organisation internationale de la Francophonie ·
Origin of the Armenians ·
Origin of the Bagratid dynasties ·
Orinats Yerkir ·
ORO Alliance ·
Orontid Dynasty ·
OSCE assessment mission to Armenia ·
Oshakan ·
Oshin of Armenia ·
Oshin of Korikos ·
Ottoman Armenian casualties ·
Outi

P
Pahlavuni ·
Pan-Armenian Congress ·
Pan-Armenian Games ·
Pan-Armenian National Agreement ·
Pan-Armenian National Movement ·
PanARMENIAN.Net .
Pap of Armenia ·
Pastırma ·
Patriarch Photios I of Constantinople ·
Patriot Party (Armenia) ·
Paulicianism ·
Pavstos Buzand ·
Paytakaran ·
Peace and Development Party (Artsakh) ·
Pensions in Armenia ·
People of Armenia ·
People's Party (Armenia) ·
People's Party of Armenia ·
Permanent Mission of Armenia to BSEC ·
Permanent Mission of Armenia to the CSTO ·
Permanent Mission of Armenia to NATO ·
Permanent Mission of Armenia to the United Nations ·
Permanent Representation of Armenia to the Council of Europe ·
Persarmenia ·
Persian Armenia ·
Peter of Sebaste ·
Pilaf ·
Pink Armenia ·
Pita ·
Plov ·
Political parties in Armenia ·
Politics of Armenia ·
Politics of Nagorno-Karabakh ·
Polyeuctus ·
Population of Armenia ·
Porak ·
Postal history of Armenia ·
Post-Armenian Genocide timeline ·
Powerful United Homeland Party ·
President of Armenia ·
President of Nagorno-Karabakh ·
President of the National Assembly of Armenia ·
Prime Minister of Armenia ·
Prime Minister of Nagorno-Karabakh ·
Princess Isabella of Armenia ·
Principality of Khachen ·
Programs of political parties in Armenia ·
Progressive United Communist Party of Armenia ·
Prosecutor General of Armenia ·
Proshyan Brandy Factory ·
Prosperous Armenia ·
Proto-Armenian language ·
Public holidays in Armenia ·
Public Radio of Armenia ·
Public Television Company of Armenia ·
Pyotr Kotlyarevsky

Q
Qadchberuni ·
Qanaqer-Zeytun ·
Qolian ·
Qubadli ·
Queen Isabella of Armenia ·
Queen Keran of Armenia

R
Railway stations in Armenia ·
Rail transport in Armenia ·
Ramgavar Party ·
Raphsonian ·
Ravished Armenia ·
Reborn Armenia ·
Recognition of same-sex unions in Armenia ·
Recognition of the Armenian Genocide ·
Reformist Party (Armenia) ·
Regions of Armenia ·
Religion in ancient Armenia ·
Religion in Armenia ·
Remposian ·
Renewed Communist Party of Armenia ·
Republic of Mountainous Armenia ·
Republic Square (Armenia) ·
Republican Party of Armenia ·
Rhadamistus ·
Right Side NGO ·
Rise Party ·
Rise the Euphrates ·
Roads in Armenia ·
Road signs in Armenia ·
Roman Armenia ·
Roman Catholicism in Armenia ·
Roman relations with the Armenians ·
Romanization of Armenian ·
Roslin Art Gallery ·
Rshtuni ·
Rshtuniq ·
Ruben I of Armenia ·
Ruben II of Armenia ·
Ruben III of Armenia ·
Rubenid dynasty ·
Rugby Federation of Armenia ·
Rule of Law (Armenia) ·
RUOR Yerevan ·
Rusas I of Urartu ·
Rusas II of Urartu ·
Russian 102nd Military Base ·
Russian Armenia ·
Russian-Armenian State University ·
Russians in Armenia ·
Russo-Persian War (1804-1813) ·
Russo-Persian War (1826-1828) ·
Russo-Turkish War (1877–1878)

S
Saghmosavank Monastery ·
Sahak Bagratuni ·
Saharuni ·
Sahl ibn-Sunbat ·
Sambo Federation of Armenia ·
Sasna Tsrer Pan-Armenian Party ·
St. Astvatzatzin ·
Saint Blaise ·
Saint Gayane Church ·
St. Gevork church ·
St. Gregory the Illuminator's Church, Baku ·
St. Hripsime Church, Echmiadzin ·
Saint Mesrob ·
Saint Narses ·
Saint Nearchus ·
St. Stepanos Church, Smyrna ·
Sames of Sophene ·
Samtskhe-Javakheti ·
San Lazzaro degli Armeni ·
Sanahin ·
Sanatruces I of Armenia ·
Sardarapat ·
Sardarapat Memorial ·
Sarduri I ·
Sarma (food) ·
Sarsang reservoir ·
Sason ·
Sasun Resistance (1894) ·
Sasun Uprising (1904) ·
Sassuntsi-Davit Tank Regiment ·
Satala ·
Saz ·
Science and technology in Armenia ·
Scouting and Guiding in Armenia ·
Security Council of Armenia ·
Selardi ·
Selkuniq ·
Sempad of Armenia ·
September 2022 Armenia–Azerbaijan clashes ·
Serart ·
Seruantztian ·
Sevan (city) ·
Sevan National Park ·
Sevanavank ·
Shabin-Karahisar uprising ·
Shaddadid ·
Shahumian ·
Shamlugh ·
Shant Alliance Nationalist Party ·
Shant TV ·
Shikahogh State Preserve ·
Shirak ·
Shirak Airport ·
Shirak Avia ·
Shnokh Hydro Power Plant ·
Shulaveri-Shomu culture ·
Shusha ·
Shusha (rayon) ·
Shushi (province) ·
Shvi ·
Siege of Van ·
Sipan Vardenis ·
Sisian ·
Siunia Dynasty ·
Sivas ·
Siwini ·
SKA Ijevan ·
SKA-Arai Echmiadzin ·
Skateboarding Federation of Armenia ·
SKIF Yerevan ·
Sky Net Airline ·
Smbat I ·
Smbat II ·
Smbat III ·
Social Democrat Hunchakian Party ·
Social issues in Armenia ·
Social Justice Party (Armenia) ·
Social protection in Armenia ·
Society for Free Armenia ·
Solar power in Armenia ·
Solidarity Party (Armenia) ·
Sophene ·
Sovereign Armenia Party ·
Soviet 76th "K. Y. Voroshilov" Division ·
Soviet 89th "Tamanyan" Rifle Division ·
Spanduni ·
Special Organization (Ottoman Empire) ·
Spelling reform of the Armenian language 1922-1924 ·
Sper (Armenia) ·
Sport in Armenia ·
Sring ·
Stability Party ·
Standing Committee on European Integration (Armenia) ·
State Engineering University of Armenia ·
State Revenue Committee (Armenia) ·
Stepanakert ·
Stepanavan ·
The Story of Zoulvisia ·
Sujuk ·
Sumgait pogrom ·
Surp Hovhannes Mkrtich ·
System of a Down ·
Syunik Kapan
Syunik Province ·

T
Tabbouleh ·
Tachir ·
Talin, Armenia ·
Tao-Klarjeti ·
Taron (historic Armenia) ·
Tartar (rayon) ·
Tashir ·
Tashir-Dzoraget ·
Tatev ·
Tavush ·
Taxation in Armenia ·
Tayk ·
Technical Assistance to the Commonwealth of Independent States ·
Tehcir Law ·
Teishebaini ·
Telecom Armenia ·
Telecommunications in Armenia ·
Television in Armenia ·
Tennis Federation of Armenia ·
Terpatuni ·
Tert.am .
Teruni ·
Teqball Federation of Armenia ·
Thaddeus Monastery ·
Theater of Armenia ·
Theispas·
The Naghash Ensemble·
Theodore Edward Dowling ·
Third Mithridatic War ·
Third Republic Party ·
Thoros I of Armenia ·
Thoros II of Armenia ·
Thoros III of Armenia ·
Three Pashas ·
Tigranakert ·
Tigranes ·
Tigranes I ·
Tigranes III ·
Tigranes IV ·
Tigranes the Great ·
Tigranes V of Armenia ·
Tigranes VI of Armenia ·
Timeline of Armenian history ·
Timeline of Armenian national movement ·
Tiridates I of Armenia ·
Tiridates III of Armenia ·
Tmoriq ·
Tobacco Policy in Armenia ·
Togarmah ·
Tomorrow Artsakh ·
Tondrakians ·
Toprakkale ·
Tourism in Armenia ·
Towards Russia Party ·
TRACECA ·
Trade unions in Armenia ·
Traditional Armenian orthography ·
Traditional Wushu Federation of Armenia ·
Transcaucasus ·
Transcaucasian Democratic Federative Republic ·
Transcaucasian SFSR ·
Transport in Armenia ·
Treaty of Alexandropol ·
Treaty of Batum ·
Treaty of Gulistan ·
Treaty of Kars ·
Treaty of Moscow (1921) ·
Treaty of San Stefano ·
Treaty of Sèvres ·
Treaty of Turkmenchay ·
Trialeti culture ·
Tsaghkadzor ·
Tsaghkadzor ski resort ·
Tsarukyan Alliance ·
Tsitsernakaberd ·
Tskhouk-Karckar ·
Tulipa armena ·
Tufagorts Artik ·
Tumanyan ·
Tumo Center for Creative Technologies ·
Turkish coffee ·
Turkish-Armenian War ·
Turuberan ·
Tushpa

U
Udi people ·
Ulisses ·
Ukrainians in Armenia ·
Unibank (Armenia) ·
Union of Communists of Armenia ·
Union of Informed Citizens ·
Union of Producers and Women ·
United Armenia Party ·
United Armenia Party (Armenia) ·
United Communist Party of Armenia ·
United Homeland Party ·
United Javakhk Democratic Alliance ·
United Labour Party (Armenia) ·
United Liberal National Party (MIAK) ·
United National Initiative (Armenia) ·
United Nations Office in Armenia ·
United States recognition of the Armenian genocide ·
Unity Party (Armenia) ·
Upper Armenia ·
Urartian language ·
Urartu ·
Urdz ·
Urfa Resistance ·
Artur Ustian · 
Utik ·
Uzh Hayrenyats ·
Uzundara

V
Vahanavank ·
Vahe ·
Vahevuni ·
Vahram Pahlavouni ·
Vahramashen Church ·
Vakıflı ·
Van Yerevan ·
Van, Turkey ·
Vanadzor ·
Vanand ·
Vannic Armenian Kingdom ·
Varajnuni ·
Varasdates (Varazdat) ·
Vardenis ·
Vartabed ·
Vartavar ·
Vayk ·
Vayots Dzor ·
Vedi ·
Vertir Airlines ·
Veteran Avia ·
Viceroyalty of the Caucasus ·
Visa policy of Argentina ·
Visa policy of Armenia ·
Visa requirements for Armenian citizens ·
Voghdji River ·
Voice Libertarian Conservative Party ·
Voice of the Nation (Armenia) ·
Volcanoes in Armenia ·
Volleyball Federation of Armenia ·
Vorotan River

W
War between Armenia and Iberia ·
War between Armenia/Rome and Iberia/Parthia ·
Water Day ·
Water Polo Federation of Armenia ·
Way Out Alliance ·
We Alliance ·
We Are Our Mountains ·
Western Armenia ·
Western Armenian language ·
Western Armenian verb table ·
White Genocide ·
Wildlife of Armenia ·
Wilsonian Armenia ·
World Armenian Congress ·
World Heritage Sites in Armenia ·
Wrestling Federation of Armenia ·
Writers Union of Armenia

X
Xerxes of Armenia

Y
Yazidis in Armenia ·
Yeghegnadzor ·
Yeghish Arakyal Monastery ·
Yeghvard ·
Yerablur ·
Yerazank Yerevan ·
Yerazi ·
Yerevan ·
Yerevan Brandy Company ·
Yerevan lake ·
Yerevan Metro ·
Yerevan railway station ·
Yerevan State Linguistic University ·
Yerevan State Medical University ·
Yerevan State Musical Conservatory ·
Yerevan State Pedagogical University ·
Yerevan State University ·
Yerevan TV Tower ·
Yerevan United ·
Yerevan Zoo ·
Yerevan-Avia ·
Yeritsmankants Monastery ·
Yerkir ·
Yerkir Media ·
Yervandashat, Armenia ·
Yervandashat (ancient city) ·
Yervant I ·
Yıldız Attempt

Z
Za'atar ·
Zakarid Armenia ·
Zakarid-Mxargrzeli ·
Zangezur Mountains ·
Zangilan ·
Zaravand ·
Zeitun Resistance (1915) ·
Zenob Glak ·
Zeytuntsyan ·
Zurna ·
Zvartnots ·
Zvartnots International Airport

See also
 Index of Artsakh-related articles
 Lists of country-related topics
 Outline of Armenia

Armenia